The Mojado Formation is a geologic formation in southwestern New Mexico. It preserves fossils dating back to the early Cretaceous period.

Description
The formation consists mostly of sandstone and shale, with some limestone, and siltstone.

Lucas and his coinvestigators assigned the formation to the Bisbee Group and divided it into the Fryingpan Spring, Sarten, Beartooth, and Rattlesnake Ridge members.

The Fryingpan Spring Member is interpreted as continental deltaic sedimentation. The Sarten Member is fluvial while the Rattlesnake Ridge Member represents a return to shallow marine conditions.

Fossils
The formation contains fossil mollusks such as gastropods, ammonites, and pelecypod, foraminifera, and scaphopods. These date the formation to the late Albian.

History of investigation
The formation name was first used by Zeller in 1962, but he did not formally name the formation until 1965. In 1998, Lucas and coinvestigators assigned the formation to the Bisbee Group and divided it into the Fryingpan Spring, Sarten, Beartooth, and Rattlesnake Ridge members. However, Lawton abandoned the Beartooth Member in 2004.

See also

 List of fossiliferous stratigraphic units in New Mexico
 Paleontology in New Mexico

Footnotes

References
 
 
 
 
 
  

Cretaceous formations of New Mexico